Vasilije "Vasa" Stojković (January 8, 1923 – June 25, 2008) was a Serbian sports journalist, basketball player and association football executive.

Sports journalism career 
Stojkovic has been engaged in sports journalism for more than 25 years. He started to work as journalist in 1946 and worked in the newspapers and magazines: Naš sport (1947–1952; sports journalist), Sport (1952–1962; editor of the football section), Eho (1962–1963, editor-in-chief) and Večernje novosti (1963–1971, editor of sports section). During his career, he reported from 45 countries from four continents, with several world championships and Olympic games.

Basketball career

Crvena zvezda 
Stojković played for Belgrade-based team Crvena zvezda of the Yugoslav First League where he won four Yugoslav Championships.

National team career 
Stojković has played 26 games for the Yugoslavia national team.

Football executive career 
Stojković was a secretary-general of the Football Association of Yugoslavia (1971–1977) and a secretary-general of Red Star Belgrade (1980–1983). He was a chief operating officer of the 1973 European Cup Final and the UEFA Euro 1976.

Career achievements and awards 
 Yugoslav Basketball League champion: 4 (with Crvena zvezda: 1946, 1947, 1948, 1949)

Individual 
 1971 May Award
 Golden Charter of Football Association of Yugoslavia

References

1923 births
2008 deaths
Association football executives
Basketball players from Belgrade
Guards (basketball)
KK Crvena zvezda players
Red Star Belgrade non-playing staff
Serbian men's basketball players
Serbian newspaper editors
Serbian columnists
University of Belgrade Faculty of Law alumni
Writers from Belgrade
Yugoslav journalists
Yugoslav men's basketball players
20th-century journalists
1942 Belgrade Basketball Championship players